The Battle of Wischau occurred on 25 November 1805, between the Russian and French armies. The conflict resulted in a minor Russian success. It followed the action at Hollabrun and Schöngrabern, and preceded the Battle of Austerlitz.  The relatively easy Russian victory convinced the Third Coalition Allies that the French army would be easy to beat, having reached the end of their supply and communication lines, and having suffered several losses in previous weeks of fighting.

Orders of Battle

French forces

General of Division Frédéric Henri Walther
Division of Reserve Cavalry
General of Division Antoine Charles Louis de Lasalle
Division of Lannes' V Corps
6th and 11th  Dragoons (4 squadrons each)
9th and 10th Hussar Regiments (4 squadrons each), and
22nd Chasseurs Chevalier (4 squadrons)
12 guns

Total: 20 squadrons, 12 guns, approximately 1400 men.

11th Dragoons lost an Imperial Eagle and a guidon during the fight.

Russian forces
Advanced Guard
Lieutenant General Bagration commanding
Major Generals Dolgoruky, Ulanius, and Tschaplitz
6th Jägers (3 battalions)
9 battalions of the Infantry Regiments Alt-Ingermannland, Archangel, and Pskov
Leib Kür Regiment (4 squadrons)
Dragoon Regiment Twer (5 squadrons)
Dragoon Regiment St. Petersburg (5 squadrons)
Hussar Regiment Pavlograd (10 Squadrons
Hussar Regiment Mariupol (10 squadrons)
Cossacks (8 sotnia)
24 guns

Total: 12 battalions, 35 squadrons, and 8 sotnias, 24 guns, approximately 12,000 men.

Sources
 Digby Smith.  The Greenhill Napoleonic Wars Databook.  London, Greenhill Books, 1998, p. 215.

External links
 

Conflicts in 1805
November 1805 events
1805 in the Austrian Empire
Battles in Moravia
Battles of the War of the Third Coalition
Czech lands under Habsburg rule
History of the South Moravian Region